RCAF Station Fingal was a Second World War British Commonwealth Air Training Plan (BCATP) air station located near Fingal, Ontario, Canada. It was operated and administered by the Royal Canadian Air Force (RCAF).

Fingal hosted No. 4 Bomber and Gunnery School (No. 4 B&GS), which trained bomb aimers and air gunners. The school opened on 25 November 1940 and closed 17 February 1945. Aircraft used included the Fairey Battle, Northrop Nomad, Westland Lysander, Bristol Bolingbroke and Avro Anson.   Bombing ranges were located near Melbourne, Frome, Tempo, and Dutton. A bombing range was also located on Lake Erie. A marine unit was based in Port Stanley.

The area is now a wildlife preserve called the "Fingal Wildlife Management Area".   Wildlife habitat has been restored and area has been set aside for agricultural demonstration purposes. Interpretive trails with signage have been installed.

Aerodrome Information  
The airfield was constructed in a typical BCATP wartime pattern, with three runways formed in a triangle. Three runways were listed as follows:

Fingal scenes

See also 
 St. Thomas Municipal Airport (Ontario)
 RCAF Station Guelph
 No. 6 Group RCAF
 Canadian Warplane Heritage Museum

References

External links 
 BCATP Station Magazines
 Interview with R. A. J. P. (Tony) Pitt, WAG trainee at No. 4 B&GS
 Fingal Wildlife Management Area Retrieved 2 March 2014
 Operations Record Book, from Library and Archives Canada
 Elgin Stewardship Council - Fingal Wildlife Management Area

Royal Canadian Air Force stations
Canadian Forces bases in Canada (closed)
Airports of the British Commonwealth Air Training Plan
BCATP
Military history of Canada during World War II